These 144 genera belong to Histerinae, a subfamily of clown beetles in the family Histeridae. There are at least 2,000 described species in Histerinae.

Histerinae genera

 Tribe Exosternini Bickhardt, 1914
 Acrolister Bickhardt, 1917
 Adelopygus Desbordes, 1917
 Anaglymma Lewis, 1894
 Apobletodes Desbordes, 1918
 Arbolister Mazur, 1990
 Aspidolister Bickhardt, 1920
 Asterix Mazur, 1993
 Baconia Lewis, 1885
 Caenolister Bickhardt, 1921
 Canarinus Mazur, 1993
 Catacraerus Bickhardt, 1920
 Chalcurgus H. Kolbe, 1897
 Chapischema Caterino & Tishechkin, 2014
 Coelocraera Marseul, 1857
 Conchita Mazur, 1994
 Conocassis Caterino & Tishechkin, 2014
 Coproxenus Lewis, 1897
 Corticalinus Gomy, 2004
 Crenulister Caterino & Tishechkin, 2014
 Cylindrolister Bickhardt, 1921
 Cylistosoma Lewis, 1905
 Cypturus Erichson, 1834
 Diabletes Reichardt, 1933
 Dolicholister Bickhardt, 1917
 Enkyosoma Caterino & Tishechkin, 2014
 Epitoxasia Cooman, 1932
 Epitoxus Lewis, 1900
 Exosternus Lewis, 1902
 Exotoxus Mazur, 1991
 Grammopeplus Bickhardt, 1911
 Heudister Cooman, 1940
 Hindophelister Mazur, 1975
 Hypobletus Schmidt, 1896
 Iarina Yélamos, 1996
 Kaszabister Mazur, 1972
 Lacrimorpha Caterino & Tishechkin, 2014
 Macrosternus Marseul, 1853
 Mecistostethus Marseul, 1870
 Monoplius Lacordaire, 1854
 Notodoma Lacordaire, 1854
 Nunbergia Mazur, 1978
 Operclipygus Marseul, 1870
 Pachycraerus Marseul, 1853
 Paratropus Gerstaecker, 1867
 Pelorurus Lacordaire, 1854
 Phelister Marseul, 1853
 Platybletes Thérond, 1952
 Platysomatinus Mazur, 1972
 Pluricosta Caterino & Tishechkin, 2014
 Probolosternus Lewis, 1900
 Procoryphaeus Mazur, 1984
 Pseudister Bickhardt, 1917
 Pyxister Caterino & Tishechkin, 2014
 Sabahister Gomy & Vienna, 2008
 Scaptorus Caterino & Tishechkin, 2014
 Sitalia Lewis, 1900
 Spathochus Marseul, 1864
 Strigister Caterino, Tishechkin & Proudfoot, 2013
 Thoraxister Desbordes, 1922
 Xenosternus Bickhardt, 1911
 Yarmister Wenzel, 1939
 Tribe Histerini Gyllenhal, 1808
 Afrohister Mazur, 2006
 Asiaster Cooman, 1948
 Atholus C. Thomson, 1859
 Barbarus Mazur, 2005
 Campylorhabdus Schmidt, 1889
 Contipus Marseul, 1854
 Coptosternus Lewis, 1914
 Epiglyptus Lewis, 1906
 Errabundus Mazur, 2006
 Eudiplister Reitter, 1909
 Eugrammicus Lewis, 1907
 Exorhabdus Lewis, 1910
 Geminorhabdus Mazur, 2007
 Ghanister Mazur, 2005
 Hister Linnaeus, 1758
 Hubenthalia Bickhardt, 1918
 Margarinotus Marseul, 1853
 Megalocraerus Lewis, 1902
 Merohister Reitter, 1909
 Nagelius Lewis, 1909
 Nasaltus Mazur & Wegrzynowicz, 2008
 Neohister Desbordes, 1928
 Neosantalus Kryzhanovskij, 1972
 Omotropis Reichardt, 1933
 Pachylister Lewis, 1904
 Pactolinus Motschulsky, 1860
 Psiloscelis Marseul, 1853
 Quassarus Mazur, 2007
 Santalus Lewis, 1906
 Seitzister Cooman, 1948
 Spilodiscus Lewis, 1906
 Sternoglyphus Desbordes, 1916
 Teinotarsus Marseul, 1864
 Tineatrix Mazur, 2006
 Zabromorphus Lewis, 1906
 Tribe Hololeptini Hope, 1840
 Dimalus Marseul, 1870
 Eutidium Lewis, 1903
 Hololepta Paykull, 1811
 Iliotona Carnochan, 1917
 Oxysternus Erichson, 1834
 Petalosoma Lewis, 1903
 Tribe Omalodini Kryzhanovskij, 1972
 Ebonius Lewis, 1885
 Omalodes Erichson, 1834
 Tribe Platysomatini Bickhardt, 1914
 Afrosoma Mazur, 1999
 Althanus Lewis, 1903
 Apobletes Marseul, 1860
 Aulacosternus Marseul, 1853
 Desbordesia Mazur, 1999
 Diister Mazur, 1989
 Eblisia Lewis, 1889
 Epuraeosoma Slipinski & Mazur, 1999
 Eurosoma Mazur & Ôhara, 2009
 Eurylister Bickhardt, 1920
 Gomyoscelis Dégallier, 2001
 Idister Marseul, 1880
 Kanaarister Mazur, 1999
 Latinolister Mazur, 1999
 Liopygus Lewis, 1891
 Megagnathos Penati & Zhang, 2009
 Mendelius Lewis, 1908
 Mesostrix Mazur, 1994
 Microlister Lewis, 1905
 Nicotikis Marseul, 1883
 Niposoma Mazur, 1999
 Pacifister Mazur & Ôhara, 2009
 Placodes Erichson, 1834
 Placodister Bickhardt, 1918
 Plaesius Erichson, 1834
 Platylister Lewis, 1892
 Platysoma Leach, 1817
 Sibelia Mazur & Ôhara, 2009
 Silinus Lewis, 1907
 Sunilis Mazur & Ôhara, 2009
 Not placed in a tribe
 Asolenus Lewis, 1906
 Atribalus Bickhardt, 1921
 Blypotehus Vienna, 2000
 Lewisister Bickhardt, 1912
 Notolister Lewis, 1894
 Perfidolenus Vienna, 2000
 Rhypochares Marseul, 1853
 Scapomegas Lacordaire, 1854
 Sphyracus Marseul, 1854
 Theropatina Mazur, 1984

References